In algebra, Exalcomm is a functor classifying the extensions of a commutative algebra by a module. More precisely, the elements of Exalcommk(R,M) are isomorphism classes of commutative k-algebras E with a homomorphism onto the k-algebra R whose kernel is the R-module M (with all pairs of elements in M having product 0). Note that some authors use Exal as the same functor. There are similar functors Exal and Exan for non-commutative rings and algebras, and functors Exaltop, Exantop. and Exalcotop that take a topology into account.

"Exalcomm" is an abbreviation for "COMMutative ALgebra EXtension" (or rather for the corresponding French phrase).

Exalcomm is one of the André–Quillen cohomology groups and one of the Lichtenbaum–Schlessinger functors.

Given homomorphisms of commutative rings A → B → C and a C-module L there is an exact sequence of A-modules 

where DerA(B,L) is the module of derivations of the A-algebra B with values in L. 
This sequence can be extended further to the right using André–Quillen cohomology.

Square-zero extensions 
In order to understand the construction of Exal, the notion of square-zero extensions must be defined. Fix a topos  and let all algebras be algebras over it. Note that the topos of a point gives the special case of commutative rings, so ignoring the topos hypothesis can be ignored on a first reading.

Definition 
In order to define the category  we need to define what a square-zero extension actually is. Given a surjective morphism of -algebras  it is called a square-zero extension if the kernel  of  has the property  is the zero-ideal.

Remark 
Since any lift differs by an element  in the kernel, andbecause the ideal is square-zero, this module structure is well-defined.

Examples

From deformations over the dual numbers 
Square-zero extensions are a generalization of deformations over the dual numbers. For example, a deformation over the dual numbershas the associated square-zero extensionof -algebras.

From more general deformations 
But, because the idea of square zero-extensions is more general, deformations over  where  will give examples of square-zero extensions.

Trivial square-zero extension 
For a -module , there is a trivial square-zero extension given by  where the product structure is given byhence the associated square-zero extension iswhere the surjection is the projection map forgetting .

Construction 
The general abstract construction of Exal follows from first defining a category of extensions  over a topos  (or just the category of commutative rings), then extracting a subcategory where a base ring   is fixed, and then using a functor  to get the module of commutative algebra extensions  for a fixed .

General Exal 
There is a functorsending a pair  to a pair  where  is a -module.

ExalA, ExalA(B, -) 
Then, there is an over category denoted  (meaning there is a functor ) where the objects are pairs , but the first ring  is fixed, so morphisms are of the form There is a further reduction to another over category  where morphisms are of the form

ExalA(B,I) 
Finally, the category  has a fixed kernel of the square-zero extensions.

The isomorphism classes of objects has the structure of a -module since  is a Picard stack, so the category can be turned into a module .

Structure of ExalA(B, I) 

Automorphisms 
The group of automorphisms of an object  can be identified with the automorphisms of the trivial extension  (explicitly, we mean automorphisms  compatible with both the inclusion  and projection ). These are classified by the derivations module . Hence, the category  is a torsor. In fact, this could also be interpreted as a Gerbe since this is a group acting on a stack.

Composition of extensions 

Application 
For example, the deformations given by infinitesimals  where  gives the isomorphismwhere  is the module of these two infinitesimals. In particular, when relating this to Kodaira-Spencer theory, and using the comparison with the contangent complex (given below) this means all such deformations are classified byhence they are just a pair of first order deformations paired together.

Relation with the cotangent complex 
The cotangent complex contains all of the information about a deformation problem, and it is a fundamental theorem that given a morphism of rings  over a topos  (note taking  as the point topos shows this generalizes the construction for general rings), there is a functorial isomorphism(theorem III.1.2.3)So, given a commutative square of ring morphismsover  there is a squarewhose horizontal arrows are isomorphisms and  has the structure of a -module from the ring morphism.

See also 

 Deformation theory
 Cotangent complex
Picard stack

References

Tangent Spaces and Obstruction Theories - Olsson

Homological algebra